Fergus McCreadie (born 12 July 1997, Jamestown, Easter Ross) is a Scottish jazz pianist. He was shortlisted for the Mercury Music Prize in 2022 for his album Forest Floor, which debuted at #1 on the UK's Official Jazz & Blues Albums Chart Top 30 on 15 April 2022. All three of McCreadie's albums have been longlisted for the Scottish Album of the Year Award: Forest Floor won in 2022 and Turas was shortlisted in 2019. McCreadie was selected by BBC Radio 3 as part of their New Generation Artists talent development scheme in September 2022, and is a two-time recipient of the Young Scottish Jazz Musician of the Year award.

Early life 
While living in a house in Dollar, Clackmannanshire, McCreadie's parents paid £20 for a broken-down piano. However, he mostly practiced with a Yamaha electric piano through headphones in his bedroom after noise complaints from a neighbor. McCreadie studied jazz at the Royal Conservatoire of Scotland where he met bassist David Bowden and drummer Stephen Henderson, the other two players on McCreadie's three albums.

Style 
McCreadie is known for combining contemporary jazz with Scottish folk music inspired by his homeland's natural landscape. McCreadie describes this genre crossover by saying "jazz is kind of a folk music in itself. It has a lot of the characteristics, and it's grown up in a lot of the same ways." McCreadie says he is most inspired by American jazz pianist Keith Jarrett and notes his music taste as also including Glenn Gould, Martha Argerich, Oscar Peterson, McCoy Tyner, Caoimhín Ó Raghallaigh, and Mick O'Brien.

Personal life 
McCreadie lives in Glasgow.

Discography
 Turas (Self-release, 2018)
 Cairn (Edition Records, 2021)
 Forest Floor (Edition Records, 2022)

Singles

References

Scottish jazz pianists
1997 births
Living people
Edition Records artists
People from Dollar, Clackmannanshire
Musicians from Glasgow
Alumni of the Royal Conservatoire of Scotland
British jazz bandleaders